George Winiata Henare  (born 11 September 1945) is a New Zealand actor with a career spanning over 50 years.

Early life
Born in Gisborne on 11 September 1945, the third youngest in a family of ten children, Henare affiliates to the Māori tribes of Ngati Porou and Ngati Hine. He lived on a farm until the age of 12 on the East Coast of New Zealand's North Island.

Career
Henare has a distinguished career as an actor in New Zealand with 50 years on stage and screen. Henare began his acting career after a stint as a postman and a trainee teacher. He has played lead roles in film, television, opera and theatre as well as radio and voice work. An early success was landing a role in a New Zealand Opera production of Porgy and Bess in 1965. He later toured Australia in Jesus Christ Superstar and Phantom of the Opera.

Film
Henare played the role of social worker Bennett in the classic New Zealand movie Once Were Warriors. Other films include Crooked Earth, Rapa Nui produced by Kevin Costner, The Silent One, The Legend of Johnny Lingo and Kawa (aka Nights in the Gardens of Spain). Henare also played a lead role in the NZ short film Mananui (1995) alongside actor Cliff Curtis.

Television
Henare has performed in numerous television dramas in New Zealand including The Park Terrace Murder (1976), the historical series Greenstone and Mercy Peak. He also acted in the award-winning docu-drama Nga Tohu: Signatures which explored political and social issues around the Treaty of Waitangi. Other television roles included appearances in Xena: Warrior Princess, Hercules: The Legendary Journeys and Street Legal.

Starting in March 2011, Henare began in a recurring guest role as Henare Ngatai, father of Roimata in the long-running soap opera Shortland Street.

Stage
On stage, Henare has played a variety of roles from classical Shakespeare, musicals, operas to contemporary New Zealand theatre. In 2006, he won the actor of the year awardat the Chapman Tripp Theatre Awards for his performance in the role of Willy Loman in Death of a Salesman at Circa Theatre, Wellington.

In 2014 Henare became patron of the Newmarket Stage Company, a professional company based in Newmarket, Auckland. To help launch the company Henare played the lead in their first two productions of Educating Rita by Willy Russell and the New Zealand premiere of Tuesdays With Morrie by Mitch Albom and Jeffrey Hatcher.

Honours and awards
In the 1988 New Year Honours, Henare was appointed an Officer of the Order of the British Empire, for services to the performing arts. In 2008, he received a Laureate Award from the Arts Foundation of New Zealand and was also honoured with the Te Waka Toi Award, Creative New Zealand for outstanding contribution to Māori theatre. He became a Companion of the New Zealand Order of Merit for services to the theatre in the 2010 New Year Honours.

References

External links
Laureate Award, Arts Foundation of New Zealand
Screenography at NZ On Screen

1945 births
Living people
People from Gisborne, New Zealand
New Zealand male film actors
New Zealand male television actors
New Zealand male Māori actors
New Zealand male soap opera actors
Ngāti Porou people
Ngāti Hine people
New Zealand Officers of the Order of the British Empire
Companions of the New Zealand Order of Merit
20th-century New Zealand male actors
21st-century New Zealand male actors